The Ministry of Urban Development  Department Maharashtra is a Ministry of the Government of Maharashtra.

The Ministry is currently headed by Eknath Shinde he is Chief Minister of Maharashtra and Cabinet Minister for this department.

Head office

List of Cabinet Ministers

List of Ministers of State

References

1960 establishments in Maharashtra
Government ministries of Maharashtra
Maharashtra